Slađana may refer to:

Slađana Božović, Serbian beauty pageant contestant
Slađana Bulatović, Montenegrin football player
Slađana Slađa Delibašić, Serbian singer
Slađana Đurić, Serbian scientist
Slađana Erić, Serbian volleyball player
Slađana Golić, Serbian basketball player
Slađana Slađa Guduraš, Bosnian Serb singer
Slađana Milošević, Serbian singer
Slađana Mirković, Serbian volleyball player
Slađana Perunović, Montenegrin long-distance runner
Slađana Pop-Lazić, Serbian handball player

References

Serbian feminine given names
Croatian feminine given names